The Énergie, Matériaux et Télécommunications (EMT, Energy, Materials and Telecommunications) is part of the INRS research university in Quebec. The center has two separate locations: Montreal (Place Bonaventure) and Varennes. The center focuses its research activities in domains such as telecommunication networks, wireless communications, multi-media signal processing, RF systems and photonic ultra-fast photonics devices. In the area of energy, the main research directions are: materials and decentralized energy systems, energy modeling and analysis (GAME), magnetic confinement fusion.

Student association
The student association is named "Céisme", an acronym for "Comité des Étudiants de l'INRS en Sciences des Matériaux et de l'Énergie". That acronym is also similar to a French word for earthquake: "séisme". The center name changed to "Énergie, Matériaux et Télécommunications" but the student association name stayed.

External links

Université du Québec